Henri Landheer (27 April 1899 – 15 March 1958) was a Dutch long-distance runner. He competed in the marathon at the 1928 Summer Olympics.

References

1899 births
1958 deaths
Athletes (track and field) at the 1928 Summer Olympics
Dutch male long-distance runners
Dutch male marathon runners
Olympic athletes of the Netherlands
People from Veendam
Sportspeople from Groningen (province)
20th-century Dutch people